In constrained least squares one solves a linear least squares problem with an additional constraint on the solution. 

There are often special-purpose algorithms for solving such problems efficiently. Some examples of constraints are given below:
 Equality constrained least squares: the elements of  must exactly satisfy  (see Ordinary least squares).
 Regularized least squares: the elements of  must satisfy  (choosing  in proportion to the noise standard deviation of y prevents over-fitting).
 Non-negative least squares (NNLS): The vector  must satisfy the vector inequality  defined componentwise—that is, each component must be either positive or zero.
 Box-constrained least squares: The vector  must satisfy the vector inequalities , each of which is defined componentwise.
 Integer-constrained least squares: all elements of  must be integers (instead of real numbers).
 Phase-constrained least squares: all elements of  must be real numbers, or multiplied by the same complex number of unit modulus.

If the constraint only applies to some of the variables, the mixed problem may be solved using separable least squares by letting  and  represent the unconstrained (1) and constrained (2) components.

where  is a projection matrix. Following the constrained estimation of  the vector  is obtained from the expression above.

See also
 Bayesian linear regression
 Constrained optimization
 Integer programming

References

Least squares